Copyhold was a form of customary land ownership common from the Late Middle Ages into modern times in England. The name for this type of land tenure is derived from the act of giving a copy of the relevant title deed that is recorded in the manorial court roll to the tenant; not the actual land deed itself. The legal owner of the manor land remained the mesne lord, who was legally the copyholder, according to the titles and customs written down in the manorial roll. In return for being given land, a copyhold tenant was required to carry out specific manorial duties or services. The specific rights and duties of copyhold tenants varied greatly from one manor to another and many were established by custom. By the 19th century, many customary duties had been replaced with the payment of rent.

Copyhold was directly descended from the feudal system of villeinage which involved giving service and produce to the local lord in return for land. Although feudalism in England had ended by the early 1500s, forms of copyhold tenure continued in England until being completely abolished by the Law of Property Act in 1925.

Principles
The privileges granted to each tenant, and the exact services he was to render to the lord of the manor and/or lord paramount in return for them, were described in the roll or book kept by the steward, who gave a copy of the relevant entry to the tenant. Consequently, these tenants were afterwards called copyholders, in contrast to freeholders. The actual term "copyhold" is first recorded in 1483, and "copyholder" in 1511–1512. The specific rights and duties of copyholders varied greatly from one manor to another and many were established by custom. Initially, some works and services to the lord were required of copyholders (four days' work per year for example), but these were commuted later to a rent equivalent. Each manor custom laid out rights to use various resources of the land such as wood and pasture, and numbers of animals allowed on the common. Copyholds very commonly required the payment of a type of death duty called an heriot to the lord of the manor upon the decease of the copyholder.

Inheritance
Two main kinds of copyhold tenure developed:
 Copyhold of inheritance: with one main tenant landholder who paid rent and undertook duties to the lord. When he died, the holding normally passed to his next heir(s) – who might be the eldest son or, if no son existed, the eldest daughter (primogeniture); the youngest son or, if no son existed, the youngest daughter ("Borough English" or ultimogeniture); or all sons or all children in equal or otherwise prescribed shares (partible inheritance or "gavelkind"), depending upon the custom of that particular manor. In practice, local rules of inheritance were often applied with considerable flexibility. During their life the tenant could usually 'sell' the holding to another person by formally surrendering it to the lord of the manor on the condition that the lord regrant it to the 'buyer'. This three-party transaction was recorded in the manorial roll and formed the new 'copyhold' for the purchaser.
 Copyhold for lives: where several (usually three) named persons held the premises for the duration of their lives. The first-named life tenant acted as tenant and paid rent and heriots; while the other two were said to be "in reversion and remainder" and effectively formed a queue. When the first life died, the second-named inherited the property and nominated a new third life for the end of the new queue. These were recorded in the court rolls as the "copyhold" for this type of tenant. It was possible to exchange the reversion and remainder lives with different ones during a lifetime upon payment of a fine to the lord. However, it was not usually possible for these holdings to be sold, as there were three lives with an entitlement. Copyhold for lives is therefore regarded as a less secure tenancy than copyhold of inheritance.

Copyhold land often did not appear in a will. This is because its inheritance was already pre-determined by custom, as just described. It could not therefore be given or devised in a will to any other person. In some instances, the executor of the estate held the copyhold for the term of one year after the decease of the testator, which was called the "executor's year", in parallel with the same concept in common law. Language regarding the disposal of the profits of the executor's year or of a heriot often indicates a copyhold.

Abolition
Copyholds were gradually enfranchised (turned into ordinary holdings of land – either freehold or 999-year leasehold) as a result of the Copyhold Acts during the 19th century. By this time, servitude to the lord of the manor was merely token, discharged on purchasing the copyhold by payment of a "fine in respite of fealty". The Copyhold Acts of 1841, 1843, 1844, 1852, 1858 and 1887 were consolidated in the Copyhold Act 1894.

Part V of the Law of Property Act 1925 finally abolished all remaining statutes.

See also
Feudal land tenure
History of English land law, including:
Grand and petty serjeanty, rent in various services
Knight-service, rent in military service
Frankalmoin or free alms, rent in religious service
Socage, rent in goods or cash, including such forms as:
Gavelkind, partible inheritance
Borough English, inheritance by the youngest son
Burgage, urban property, often including voting rights, with various rent conditions
Villein (a type of tenure which preceded copyhold)

References

Further reading
 Andrew Barsby (1996). Manorial Law.
 Gray, C. M. (1963). Copyhold, Equity and the Common Law.
 Scriven, John, (Serjeant at law), A treatise on copyhold, customary freehold, and ancient demesne tenure: with the jurisdiction of Courts baron and Courts leet; also an appendix, containing rules for holding Customary courts, Courts baron and Courts leet, forms of court rolls, deputations, and copyhold assurances, and extracts from the relative acts of Parliament, 2 vols., 2nd. ed., London, 1823.
 Tawney, R. H. (1912). The Agrarian Problem of the Sixteenth Century.

Real property law
English legal terminology
English property law
Medieval English law
Feudalism in England
Land tenure